Gauna flavibasalis is a species of snout moth in the genus Gauna. It is known from Australia.

References

Moths described in 1906
Pyralini